Glenea clytoides is a species of beetle in the family Cerambycidae. It was described by Francis Polkinghorne Pascoe in 1867. It is known from Singapore and Malaysia.

Subspecies
 Glenea clytoides bankaensis Breuning, 1956
 Glenea clytoides clytoides (Pascoe, 1867)

References

clytoides
Beetles described in 1867